The men's 50 metre freestyle S2 event at the 2008 Paralympic Games took place on September 13, at the Beijing National Aquatics Center.

Two heats were held, with five swimmers each. The swimmers with the eight fastest times advanced to the final; there, they all competed in a single final heat to earn final placements.

Heats

Heat 1

Heat 2

Final

External links 
 Heats and Final Results - Men's 50 Meter Freestyle S2

Swimming at the 2008 Summer Paralympics